Family resemblance is a philosophical idea made popular by Ludwig Wittgenstein, with the best known exposition given in his posthumously published book Philosophical Investigations (1953). It argues that things which could be thought to be connected by one essential common feature may in fact be connected by a series of overlapping similarities, where no one feature is common to all of the things. Games, which Wittgenstein used as an example to explain the notion, have become the paradigmatic example of a group that is related by family resemblances. It has been suggested that Wittgenstein picked up the idea and the term from Friedrich Nietzsche, who had been using it, as did many nineteenth century philologists, when discussing language families.

The first occurrence of the term family resemblance is found in Arthur Schopenhauer (1788–1860; The World As Will and Representation §§17, 27, 28) who attributed the term to the school developed by Friedrich Wilhelm Joseph von Schelling (1775–1854). The next occurrence appeared in a note from 1930, commenting on Oswald Spengler's ideas. The notion itself features widely in Wittgenstein's later work, and in the Investigations it is introduced in response to questions about the general form of propositions and the essence of language – questions which were central to Wittgenstein throughout his philosophical career. This suggests that family resemblance was of prime importance for Wittgenstein's later philosophy; however, like many of his ideas, it is hard to find precise agreement within the secondary literature on either its place within Wittgenstein's later thought or on its wider philosophical significance.

Since the publication of the Investigations, the notion of family resemblance has been discussed extensively not only in the philosophical literature, but also, for example, in works dealing with classification where the approach is described as "polythetic", distinguishing it from the traditional approach known now as "monothetic". Prototype theory is a recent development in cognitive science where this idea has also been explored. As the idea gained popularity, earlier instances of its occurrence were rediscovered e.g. in 18th-century taxonomy, in the writings of Lev Vygotsky or Władysław Tatarkiewicz.

Philosophical context
The local context where the topic of family resemblances appears is Wittgenstein's critique of language. In Philosophical Investigations §65-71 the plurality of language uses is compared to the plurality of games. Next it is asserted that games have common features but no one feature is found in all of them. The whole argument has become famous under the heading 'language games'.

The larger context in which Wittgenstein's philosophy is seen to develop considers his uncompromising opposition to essences, mental entities and other forms of idealism which were accepted as a matter of fact in continental philosophy at the turn of the preceding century. In his view, the main cause for such errors is language and its uncritical use. In the received view, concepts, categories or classes are taken to rely on necessary features common to all items covered by them. Abstraction is the procedure which acknowledges this necessity and derives essences, but in the absence of a single common feature, it is bound to fail.

Terminology
The term "Family resemblance" as feature of Wittgenstein's philosophy owes much to its translation in English. Wittgenstein, who wrote mostly in German, used the compound word , but as he lectured and conversed in English he used 'family likeness' (e.g. The Blue Book, p. 17,33; The Brown Book,§66). However, in the Philosophical Investigations the separate word  has been translated as 'similarity' (§§11,130,185,444) and on two occasions (§§9,90) it is given as 'like'.  The German family-word is common, and it is found in Grimm's dictionary; a rare occurrence of 'family likeness' has been noted in a lecture by J. F. Moulton in 1877.

Examples and quotes
Games are the main example considered by Wittgenstein in his text, where he also mentions numbers and makes an analogy with a thread. He develops his argument further by insisting that in such cases there is not a clear-cut boundary, but there arises some ambiguity if this indefiniteness can be separated from the main point.
In §66 Wittgenstein invites us to 
The section mentions card games, board games, ball games, games like ring-a-ring-a-roses and concludes:

The following §67 begins by stating:

and extends the illustration

The problem of boundaries begins in §68

Formal models
There are some simple models
which can be derived from the text of §66-9. The most simple one, which fits Wittgenstein's exposition, seems to be the sorites type. It consists in a collection of items Item_1, Item_2, Item_3... described by features A, B, C, D, ...:

Item_1: A B C D               
Item_2:   B C D E             
Item_3:     C D E F         
Item_4:       D E F G        
Item_5:         E F G H      
......... . . . .

In this example, which presents an indefinitely extended ordered family, resemblance is seen in shared features: each item shares three features with his neighbors e.g. Item_2 is like Item_1 in respects B, C, D, and like Item_3 in respects C, D, E. Obviously what we call 'resemblance' involves different aspects in each particular case. It is also seen to be of a different 'degree' and here it fades with 'distance': Item_1 and Item_5 have nothing in common.

Another simple model is described as:

Item_1: A B C   
Item_2:   B C D 
Item_3: A C D 
Item_4: A B D 
It exhibits the presence of a constant degree of resemblance, and the
absence of a common feature without extending to infinity.

Wittgenstein rejects the disjunction of features or 'properties', i.e. the set {A,B,C,D,..}, as something shared by all items. He admits that a 'sharing' is common to all, but deems that it is only verbal:

Notable applications
Thomas Kuhn uses Wittgenstein's concept in chapter V ('The Priority of Paradigms) of his famous The Structure of Scientific Revolutions (1962). Paradigms are not reducible to single discoverable sets of scientific rules, but consist of assumptions that relate to other rules that are recognized by parts of a scientific community.
Morris Weitz first applied family resemblances in an attempt to describe art. which opened a still continuing debate.
Ezra LaFleur argues for using the idea of family resemblance to clarify discussion of musical genre.
Umberto Eco argued that while regimes may differ wildly in their particulars, manifestations of fascism can be recognized by a kind of family resemblance.
Renford Bambrough proposed that "Wittgenstein solved what is known as "the problem of universals and said of his solution (as Hume said of Berkeley's treatment of the same topic) that it is "one of the greatest and most valuable discoveries that has been made of late years in the republic of letters". His view provided the occasion for numerous further comments.
Rodney Needham explored family resemblances in connection with the problem of alliance and noted their presence in taxonomy, where they are known as a polythetic classification.
Eleanor Rosch used family resemblances in her cognitivist studies. Other cognitive research has shown that children and even rhesus monkeys tend to use family resemblance relationships rather than explicit rules when learning categories.

Criticism and comments

Philosophical Investigations is the primary text used in discussing family resemblances, although the topic appears also in other works by Wittgenstein, notably The Brown Book. Many contributions to the discussion are by people involved in philosophical research but concerned with more pragmatic questions such as taxonomy or information processing. Hans Sluga has observed that "the notion of family resemblance... draws on two quite different sets of ideas, two different vocabularies, but treats them as if they were one and the same. The first is the vocabulary of kinship, of descent, of some sort of real and causal connection.. the second is that of similarity, resemblance, affinity and correspondence."

Wittgenstein's insistence that boundaries do not really exist but can be traced arbitrarily has been described as conventionalism and more generally the acceptance of his conception has been seen to present a refined nominalism.

See also
Composite photography
Composite portrait
 Polyphyly
 Prototype theory

Notes

References

Andersen H.,: 2000, Kuhn's account of family resemblance, Erkenntnis 52: 313–337
Bambrough, R.: 1961, Universals and Family Resemblance, Proc. Arist. Soc. 61, 207–22
Beardsmore, R. W.: 1992, The Theory of Family Resemblance, Philosophical Investigations 15, 131–146
Bellaimey, J. E.: 1990, Family Resemblances and the Problem of the Under-Determination of Extension, Philosophical Investigations 13, 31–43.
 Drescher, F.: 2017, Analogy in Thomas Aquinas and Ludwig Wittgenstein. A comparison. New Blackfriars. doi:10.1111/nbfr.12273
Ginzburg C.,: 2004, Family Resemblances and Family Trees: Two Cognitive Metaphors, Critical Inquiry, Vol. 30, No. 3 (Spring 2004), pp. 537–556
Griffin, N.: 1974, Wittgenstein, Universals and Family Resemblance, Canadian Journal of Philosophy III, 635–651.
Gupta, R. K.: 1970, Wittgenstein's Theory of "Family Resemblance", in his Philosophical Investigations (Secs. 65–80), Philosophia Naturalis 12, 282–286
Huff D.:(1981), Family Resemblances and rule governed behavior, Philosophical Investigations 4 (3) 1–23
Kaufman D.: 2007,  Family resemblances Relationism and the meaning of "art",  British Journal of Aesthetics, vol. 47, No. 3, July 2007, 
Prien B.: Family Resemblances-A Thesis about the Change of Meaning over Time, Kriterion 18 (2004), pp. 15–24.
Raatzsch R., Philosophical Investigations 65ff. :On Family Resemblance, in Essays on Wittgenstein by P. Philipp and R. Raatzsch, Working papers from the Wittgenstein Archives at the University of Bergen #6 (1993), pp. 50–76
Wennerberg, H.: 1967, The Concept of Family Resemblance in Wittgenstein's Later Philosophy, Theoria 33, 107–132.

Analytic philosophy
Concepts in the philosophy of language
Ludwig Wittgenstein
Semantic relations